Maree was a Legislative Assembly electorate in the state of Queensland, Australia.

History
Maree was created by the 1910 Electoral Districts Act, taking effect at the 1912 elections. It was based on Kangaroo Point, Queensland and consisted of the slightly altered Electoral district of Woolloongabba, which was abolished in 1912.

Most of the area of Maree and was incorporated into the Electoral district of Norman in 1950.

Members

The following people were elected in the seat of Maree:

Election results

See also
 Electoral districts of Queensland
 Members of the Queensland Legislative Assembly by year
 :Category:Members of the Queensland Legislative Assembly by name

References

Former electoral districts of Queensland
1912 establishments in Australia
1950 disestablishments in Australia
Constituencies established in 1912
Constituencies disestablished in 1950